Light Bobs may refer to:

 British light infantry; see History of British light infantry
 52nd (Oxfordshire) Regiment of Foot